Thomas Henry Sage VC (8 December 1882 – 20 July 1945) was an English recipient of the Victoria Cross, the highest and most prestigious award for gallantry in the face of the enemy that can be awarded to British and Commonwealth forces. 

Sage was born in Tiverton in Devon and returned there after his military service. He was 34 years old, and a private in the 8th Battalion, The Somerset Light Infantry (Prince Albert's), British Army during the First World War when the following deed took place for which he was awarded the VC.

On 4 October 1917 at Tower Hamlets Spur, east of Ypres, Belgium, Private Sage was in a shell-hole with eight other men, one of whom was shot while throwing a bomb which fell back into the shell-hole. Private Sage, with great presence of mind, immediately threw himself on it, and so saved the lives of several of his comrades, although he himself was severely wounded.

Sage died in 1945 and was buried in Tiverton Cemetery.

References

Monuments to Courage (David Harvey, 1999)
The Register of the Victoria Cross (This England, 1997)
VCs of the First World War - Passchendaele 1917 (Stephen Snelling, 1998)

External links
Location of grave and VC medal (Devonshire)

1882 births
1945 deaths
Military personnel from Tiverton, Devon
British World War I recipients of the Victoria Cross
Somerset Light Infantry soldiers
British Army personnel of World War I
British Army recipients of the Victoria Cross
Burials in Devon